The 1901 Home Nations Championship was the nineteenth series of the rugby union Home Nations Championship. Six matches were played between 5 January and 16 March. It was contested by England, Ireland, Scotland and Wales.

Scotland won all their three games to take the championship for the fifth time outright (excluding two other titles shared with England) and complete the Triple Crown for the third time.

Table

Results

Scoring system
The matches for this season were decided on points scored. A try was worth three points, while converting a kicked goal from the try gave an additional two points. A dropped goal and a goal from mark were both worth four points. Penalty goals were worth three points.

The matches

Wales vs. England

Wales: Billy Bancroft (Swansea) capt., Llewellyn (Llwynypia), Gwyn Nicholls (Cardiff), George Davies (Swansea), Billy Trew (Swansea), Llewellyn Lloyd (Newport), Bala Jones (Aberavon), Bob Thomas (Swansea), Jere Blake (Cardiff), William Williams (Pontymister), Fred Miller (Mountain Ash), Alfred Brice (Aberavon), Jehoida Hodges (Newport), George Boots (Newport), Dick Hellings (Penygraig)

England: JW Sagar (Cambridge Uni), C Smith (Gloucester), EJ Vivyan (Devonport Albion), JT Taylor (West Hartlepool) capt., Edgar Elliot (Sunderland), Reggie Schwarz (Richmond), Ernest John "Katie" Walton (Oxford Uni), A O'Neill (Torquay Athletic), D Graham (Aspatria), CT Scott (Blackheath), AFC Luxmoore (Richmond), H Alexander (Birkenhead Park), NC Fletcher (OMT), COP Gibson (Northern), EW Roberts (RNEC Keyham)

Ireland vs. England

Ireland: J Fulton (NIFC), AE Freear (Lansdowne), BRW Doran (Lansdowne), JB Allison (Queen's Uni, Belfast), IG Davidson (NIFC), Louis Magee (Bective Rangers) capt., A Barr (Methodist C. Belfast), AG Heron (Queen's Uni, Belfast), M Ryan (Rockwell College), Samuel Irwin (Queen's Uni, Belfast), CE Allen (Derry), P Healey (Limerick), TJ Little (Bective Rangers), F Gardiner (NIFC), J Ryan (Rockwell College)

England: JW Sagar (Cambridge Uni), GC Robinson (Percy Park), WL Bunting (Moseley) capt., JT Taylor (West Hartlepool), Edgar Elliot (Sunderland), Reggie Schwarz (Richmond), Ernest John "Katie" Walton (Oxford Uni), A O'Neill (Torquay Athletic), RD Wood (Liverpool OB), CT Scott (Blackheath), C Hall (Gloucester), H Alexander (Birkenhead Park), NC Fletcher (OMT), S Reynolds (Richmond), EW Roberts (RNEC Keyham)

Scotland vs. Wales

Scotland: AW Duncan (Edinburgh University), WH Welsh (Edinburgh Acads), AN Fell (Edinburgh University), Alec Boswell Timms  (Edinburgh University), P Turnbull (Edinburgh Acads), FH Fasson (Edinburgh University), Jimmy Gillespie (Edinburgh Acads), J Ross (London Scottish), AB Flett (Edinburgh University), Alex Frew (Edinburgh University), David Bedell-Sivright (Cambridge Uni), Mark Coxon Morrison  (Royal HSFP) capt., RS Stronarch (Glasgow Acads), John Dykes (Glasgow HFSP), JA Bell (Clydesdale)

Wales: Billy Bancroft (Swansea) capt., Llewellyn (Llwynypia), Gwyn Nicholls (Cardiff), George Davies (Swansea), Billy Trew (Swansea), Llewellyn Lloyd (Newport), Lou Phillips (Newport), Hopkin Davies (Swansea), Jere Blake (Cardiff), William Alexander (Llwynypia), Fred Miller (Mountain Ash), Alfred Brice (Aberavon), Jehoida Hodges (Newport), George Boots (Newport), Dick Hellings (Penygraig)

Scotland vs. Ireland

Scotland: AW Duncan (Edinburgh University), WH Welsh (Edinburgh Acads), AN Fell (Edinburgh University), Alec Boswell Timms  (Edinburgh University), P Turnbull (Edinburgh Acads), FH Fasson (Edinburgh University), Jimmy Gillespie (Edinburgh Acads), J Ross (London Scottish), AB Flett (Edinburgh University), Alex Frew (Edinburgh University), David Bedell-Sivright (Fettesian-Lorettonian), Mark Coxon Morrison  (Royal HSFP) capt., FP Dods (Edinburgh Acads), John Dykes (Glasgow HSFP), JA Bell (Clydesdale)

Ireland: Cecil Boyd (Wanderers), AE Freear (Lansdowne), BRW Doran (Lansdowne), JB Allison (Queen's Uni, Belfast), IG Davidson (NIFC), Louis Magee (Bective Rangers) capt., A Barr (Methodist C. Belfast), Thomas Arnold Harvey (Dublin University), M Ryan (Rockwell College), HAS Irvine (Belfast Collegians), CE Allen (Derry), P Healey (Limerick), TJ Little (Bective Rangers), Tom McGown (NIFC), J Ryan (Rockwell College)

England vs. Scotland

England: HT Gamlin (Blackheath), GC Robinson (Percy Park), WL Bunting (Moseley) capt., NS Cox (Sunderland), Edgar Elliot (Sunderland), B Oughtred (Hartlepool Rovers), PD Kendall (Birkenhead Park), A O'Neill (Torquay Athletic), George Ralph Gibson (Northern), HTF Weston (Northampton), C Hall (Gloucester), H Alexander (Birkenhead Park), NC Fletcher (OMT), CS Edgar (Birkenhead Park), Bernard Charles Hartley (Blackheath)

Scotland: AW Duncan (Edinburgh University), WH Welsh (Edinburgh Acads), AN Fell (Edinburgh University), Alec Boswell Timms  (Edinburgh University), P Turnbull (Edinburgh Acads), RM Neill (Edinburgh Acads), Jimmy Gillespie (Edinburgh Acads), J Ross (London Scottish), AB Flett (Edinburgh University), Alex Frew (Edinburgh University), David Bedell-Sivright (Fettesian-Lorettonian), Mark Coxon Morrison (Royal HSFP) capt., RS Stronarch (Glasgow Acads), John Dykes (Glasgow HFSP), JA Bell (Clydesdale)

Wales vs. Ireland

Wales: Billy Bancroft (Swansea) capt., Llewellyn (Llwynypia), Gwyn Nicholls (Cardiff), George Davies (Swansea), Rhys Gabe (Llanelli), Dicky Owen (Swansea), Dick Jones (Swansea), Hopkin Davies (Swansea), Jere Blake (Cardiff), William Alexander (Llwynypia), Fred Miller (Mountain Ash), Alfred Brice (Aberavon), Bob Jones (Llwynypia), George Boots (Newport), Fred Scrine (Swansea)

Ireland: Cecil Boyd (Wanderers), AE Freear (Lansdowne), BRW Doran (Lansdowne), JB Allison (Queen's Uni, Belfast), IG Davidson (NIFC), Louis Magee (Bective Rangers) capt., HH Ferris (Queen's Uni, Belfast), Thomas Arnold Harvey (Dublin University), M Ryan (Rockwell College), Samuel Irwin (Queen's Uni, Belfast), CE Allen (Derry), P Healey (Limerick), JJ Coffey (Lansdowne), F Gardiner (NIFC), J Ryan (Rockwell College)

Bibliography

External links

1900–01
1900–01 in British rugby union
1900–01 in English rugby union
rugby union
rugby union
Home Nations Championship
Home Nations Championship
Home Nations Championship
1900–01 in Scottish rugby union